The discography of American rock band Saves the Day consists of nine studio albums, two compilation albums, five extended plays, and nine singles.

Albums

Studio albums

Compilation albums

Extended plays

Singles

Music videos

See also
 List of songs recorded by Saves the Day

References

Discographies of American artists

Pop punk group discographies